The 2008 LifeLock.com 400 was the nineteenth race of the 2008 NASCAR Sprint Cup season, and the final race under the TNT coverage for the year.

Summary 
It was held on July 12 of that year at Chicagoland Speedway in Joliet, Illinois, as the race moved to a nighttime event for the first time in the event's history. Televised pre-race activities were scheduled to start at 6:30 PM US EDT, with the radio broadcast of the race handled by Sirius Satellite Radio via MRN, starting at 7:15 PM US EDT. The winner of the race was Kyle Busch, who drove past Jimmie Johnson on the final restart of the race. During practice, Kurt Busch uttered over the radio that his "car just drives like shit".

Qualifying
Qualifying was cancelled due to rain, so the field was set by NASCAR's rulebook.

Johnny Sauter in the No. 08 and Tony Raines in the No. 34 failed to qualify for the race.

References

LifeLock.com 400
LifeLock.com 400
NASCAR races at Chicagoland Speedway